The 1944 Penn Quakers football team was an American football team that represented the University of Pennsylvania as an independent during the 1944 college football season. In its seventh season under head coach George Munger, the team compiled a 5–3 record and outscored opponents by a total of 165 to 149. The team played its home games at Franklin Field in Philadelphia.

Schedule

References

Penn
Penn Quakers football seasons
Penn Quakers football